A "quadrangle" is a topographic map produced by the United States Geological Survey (USGS) covering the United States. The maps are usually named after local physiographic features. The shorthand "quad" is also used, especially with the name of the map; for example, "the Ranger Creek, Texas quad". A quadrangle is defined by north and south boundaries of constant latitude (which are not great circles so are curved), and by east and west boundaries of constant longitude.

From approximately 1947-1992, the USGS produced the 7.5 minute series, with each map covering an area one-quarter of the older 15-minute quad series, which it replaced. Both map series were produced via photogrammetric analysis of aerial photography using stereoplotters supplemented by field surveys. These maps employ the 1927 North American Datum (NAD27); conversion or a change in settings is necessary when using a GPS which by default employ the WGS84 geodetic datum. Beginning in 2009, the USGS made available digital versions of 7.5 minute quadrangle maps based on GIS data that use the NAD83 datum, which is typically within one meter of WGS84, or within the uncertainty of most GPS coordinate measurements. The USGS also produces quarter quadrangle (QQ) maps of areas 3.75 minutes square.

The surfaces of other planets have also been divided into quadrangles by the USGS. Martian quadrangles are also named after local features.

See also
 GEOREF quadrangle
 List of quadrangles on Mercury
 List of quadrangles on Venus
 List of quadrangles on the Moon
 List of quadrangles on Mars
 List of quadrangles on Ganymede
 Quadrilateral

References

Cartography